Jack Grimes (April 1, 1926 – March 10, 2009) was an American voice and radio actor who played Jimmy Olsen in the last three years of The Adventures of Superman radio program, and the 1966 Filmation TV series The New Adventures of Superman. He is also known for his performance as the mechanic Sparky, and the pet chimp Chim-Chim in the 1967 anime Speed Racer.

Early years 
Grimes was born April 1, 1926, in New York City. His acting career began at age seven during the Great Depression, when he helped earn money for his family. He completed grammar school at the Professional Children's School and went on to complete four years at Columbia University.

Career

Stage 
Grimes appeared as Jackie Grimes in the Broadway play The Old Maid, which won a Pulitzer Prize and ran for 10 months in New York. It then went on tour for another 11 months. His other Broadway credits include Stork Mad (1936), Excursion (1937), and Western Waters (1937–1938).

Radio 
Grimes worked on radio, beginning with the CBS program Let's Pretend. He was also a regular on The Fred Allen Show, The Philip Morris Playhouse, Second Husband, CBS Radio Mystery Theater, and Death Valley Days. By age 12, he was appearing on 35 to 40 radio shows a week.

Film 
In 1944, Grimes moved to California to work for Universal. His credits include Fairytale Murder, Lady on a Train, and Week-End at the Waldorf. In the early 1950s, he switched to television. His credits include Alcoa Presents, Love of Life, The Aldrich Family, Tom Corbett, Space Cadet, Maude, On the Rocks, and All in the Family.

In 1962, Grimes and Peter Fernandez worked together on a series of records for MGM. Five years later, Fernandez hired him to do the voices of Sparky and Chim Chim on Speed Racer.

River Gang (1945) – Goofy
Speed Racer (1967) – Chim-Chim / Sparky (voice)
Pendulum (1969) – Artie
The Wonderful World of Puss 'n Boots (1969) – Pierre (voice)
Cold Turkey (1971) – TV Stage Manager
Jack and the Beanstalk (1974) – Crosby (English version, voice, uncredited)
Enchanted Journey (1981) – (voice)

Death 
Grimes died in Queens, New York City, in 2009 at age 82.

References

External links 
 
 
 Social Security Death Index

1926 births
2009 deaths
20th-century American male actors
21st-century American male actors
American male voice actors
American male radio actors
Male actors from New York City